The 1973–74 Utah Stars season was the 4th season of the Stars in Utah and 7th  overall in the American Basketball Association. The Stars were 8th in points scored at 105.1 per game and 4th in points allowed at 104.7 per game. From January 21st to February 18th, they won 14 straight games. A week later, they began a 5 game losing streak, but the team finished 18 games above .500. In the playoffs, the Stars went all the way to the ABA Finals for the 2nd time in four seasons. However, they lost to the New York Nets in five games.

Roster
 44 John Beasley - Power forward
 31 Zelmo Beaty - Power forward
 24 Ron Boone - Shooting guard
 40 Glen Combs - Shooting guard
 14 Roy Ebron - Center
 25 Gerald Govan - Center
 21 Mike Jackson - Power forward
 15 Jimmy Jones - Point guard
 11 Rick Mount - Shooting guard
 22 Johnny Neumann - Shooting guard
 33 Ronnie Robinson - Power forward
 10 Bruce Seals - Small forward
 12 Bob Warren - Shooting guard
 42 Willie Wise - Small forward

Final standings

Western Division

Playoffs
Western Division Semifinals

Stars win series, 4–2

Western Division Finals vs Indiana Pacers

Stars win series, 4–3

ABA Finals vs. New York Nets

Stars lose series, 4–1

Awards and honors
1974 ABA All-Star Game selections (game played on January 30, 1974)
 Jimmy Jones
 Willie Wise
 Ron Boone

References

External links
 RememberTheABA.com 1973–74 regular season and playoff results
 Utah Stars page

Utah Stars seasons
Utah Stars
Utah Stars, 1973–74
Utah Stars, 1973–74